Dargaz, also known as Darreh Gaz, is a city in Razavi Khorasan Province, Iran. 

Dargaz or Darreh Gaz may also refer to:
 Dargaz, Bandar Abbas, Hormozgan Province
 Dargaz, Bashagard, Hormozgan Province
 Dargaz, Hajjiabad, Hormozgan Province
 Dargaz Kulak, Kerman Province
 Dargaz, Sistan and Baluchestan
 Dargaz, Chabahar, Sistan and Baluchestan Province
 Dargaz County, in Razavi Khorasan Province